Schüssler or Schuessler or Schüßler is a surname. Notable people with the surname include:

Benjamin Schüßler (born 1981), German football player
Brittany Schussler (born 1985), Canadian speed skater
Elisabeth Schüssler Fiorenza (born 1938), feminist theologian
Francis Schüssler Fiorenza, Stillman Professor of Roman Catholic Theological Studies at Harvard Divinity School
Harry Schüssler (born 1957), Swedish chess grandmaster
Hans Wilhelm Schüßler (1928–2007), German telecommunications engineer and professor
Jan Wilhelm Schüssler (born 1965), Norwegian show producer
Karl Schüßler (1924–2023), West German cross country skier
Otto Schüssler (1905–1982), German communist
Wilhelm Heinrich Schüßler (1821–1898), German medical doctor who endeavoured to find natural remedies

Occupational surnames